S Club 8 (originally S Club Juniors) were a spin off of the British pop group S Club 7. The group's members, Jay Asforis, Daisy Evans, Calvin Goldspink, Stacey McClean, Aaron Renfree, Hannah Richings, Frankie Sandford and Rochelle Wiseman were all in their early teens or younger when they were chosen from thousands of hopefuls on the television series S Club Search in 2001.

The group was originally intended only as a support act at Wembley Arena on S Club 7's S Club Carnival Tour. The group also had its own documentary series, S Club Juniors: The Story.

History

2001–2002: Formation and Together

S Club Juniors was formed in 2001 through a reality television show originally consisting of ten members; original members Connor Daley left the group soon after its formation to accept a scholarship to study ballet at a performing arts school.Then the youngest member; Marcell Peters left due to other projects. The auditions were aired on CBBC. S Club Juniors' appearances were considered a success by 19 Entertainment, the management company that had created S Club 7 and auditioned S Club Juniors. Consequently, it was decided they should perform as a support act at all of the venues on the tour. The juniors made their first television appearance on Children in Need on 16 November 2001. By the end of the tour, S Club Juniors had created a following and, with the encouragement of 19, Polydor Records signed the group. Their first single was called "One Step Closer". It was promoted by the TV series S Club Junior: The Story and released in the UK on 22 April 2002 in a chart battle with the Sugababes who released their comeback single the same day. Although the Juniors remained number one in the midweek charts, the single dipped over the weekend and managed to sell 73,000 copies, compared to the Sugababes' 85,000. The Juniors stayed at number two for a second week selling a further 60,000 copies, compared to Holly Valance's 143,000. In excess of 250,000 copies were sold in the UK in total and they stayed in the UK top 75 for 11 weeks.

The group began working on their studio album in June 2002. A video for the second single, "Automatic High", was filmed in Spain, while S Club 7 began their fourth TV series. Released on 22 July 2002, the single reached number two in the UK charts selling 52,000 copies, and spent eight weeks inside the UK top 75 and sold in excess of 110,000 copies in the UK. The third single, "New Direction", was released on 10 October reached number two in the UK charts selling 55,000 copies in the first week. It became their third consecutive top ten hit, selling 130,000 copies in six weeks. The Juniors released their debut album Together on 21 October reaching number five in its first week of sale and selling 40,000 copies. Their fourth single, "Puppy Love/Sleigh Ride", was released on 9 December 2002. The single debuted at number six in the UK charts, and sold 85,000 copies in the UK, spending eight weeks inside the UK Top 40. The song was also used in the 2003 film Love Actually.

2003–2004: Sundown, "I Dream" and split
The group joined S Club on their S Club United tour in April 2003 where the announcement came of a name change to S Club 8 and a fifth single, "Fool No More". The single was released on 30 June and reached number four in the UK chart, selling 26,000 copies in its first week and overall 75,000 copies in the UK. A second single, "Sundown", was released in the UK on 29 September 2003 reaching number four in the UK and became their sixth and final top ten hit and selling 37,000 copies in its first week and 80,000 altogether. The album, Sundown, was released on 13 October 2003 and reached number 13 in the UK charts, falling to number 40 in the second week. Despite selling a total of 60,000 copies in the UK and 315,859 worldwide, the record company perceived the album as a failure. In a review for BBC Music, Jack Smith stated that some of Sundowns tracks, "come across as brattier, livelier, younger relatives of... S Club('s)", and that "the album only really flags when the '8 attempt to do more grown-up songs". The third single, "Don't Tell Me You're Sorry", was released on 29 December 2003 in the UK where it reached number 11, becoming the band's first single to chart outside the top ten.

Unlike the S Club 7 shows which focused upon the group's fictional exploits, I Dream saw S Club 8 as members of a larger ensemble cast. I Dream revolved around the summer school Avalon Heights, run by Professor Toone (played by Christopher Lloyd of Back to the Future fame), where the characters tried to improve on their talents in the performing arts. The show featured many songs and dances: normally two songs per episode. . On 15 November 2004, the show's theme tune "Dreaming" was released as a single, sung by members Frankie and Calvin. The single charted at number 19, falling to 36 the following week, then out of the UK top 40. On 29 November 2004 an album titled Welcome to Avalon Heights was released, containing songs from the show performed by S Club 8 members and the rest of the cast. The album debuted at number 133, having sold around 700 copies. The following week, it left the chart entirely.

The group disbanded in late 2004. In 2020 band mate Jay Asforis hosted a series of Instagram live conversations with his former fellow band mates, in his conversation with Daisy Evans she recalled her memories of the bands split explaining that after I Dream was filmed, the band (along with their parents) where told by 19 Entertainment the programme would be aired however following this the band would be shelved for a while and their tutoring would be stopped advising them to go back to school. Stacey McClean also mentioned her memories of the split explaining she was told the “lease was up” on the house she shared with fellow band mates Hannah Richings, Aaron Renfree and Calvin Goldspink and following her move back home was told she would hear about “future projects” however nothing was mentioned and the group never reformed.

Members
 (born 30 October 1988,  years old) did not appear at the S Club Juniors auditions, instead sending a video tape of himself to S Club 7 who allowed him through to the final auditions. He trained at The Susi Earnshaw Theatre School and attended Roding Valley High School. From March 2018, Asforis starred as the leading role of Berry Gordy in the West End production of 'Motown: The Musical' in Shaftesbury Theatre, London. As of November 2019, Asforis can be seen as standby for the roles of Alexander Hamilton and Marquis de Lafayette/Thomas Jefferson in Hamilton at the Victoria Palace Theatre. 
 (born 30 November 1989,  years old): from early 2007, Evans was a member of five-piece female group, From Above. After touring the UK and a series of line-up changes, in September 2008 they were signed by Beyoncé's father Mathew Knowles and Music World Records. The group moved to America to work on their debut album, documented on the MTV reality show, Breaking From Above. A music video for debut "Not The Same Girl" was released on 2 December 2011. The single and the album, Breaking From Above was released on 12 December. They then arrived for the "Boot camp" stages for The X Factor, but were rejected. In 2013 Evans became engaged to footballer Jonjo Shelvey. They went on to marry in June 2015. The couple's first daughter named Lola arrived on 4 March 2014. Evans gave birth to the couple's second daughter named Alba, on 31 May 2016. In July 2020 during an instagram live with bandmate Jay Asforis, Evans announced she was expecting her third child, a boy later that year. Her son Jorgio was born on 4 November 2020.
Calvin Goldspink (born 24 January 1989,  years old): At the age of 12, Goldspink auditioned for S Club Juniors. He later went on to appear in the only season of Life is Wild for the CW network in 2007. Goldspink has previously recorded in different cities such as Los Angeles, New York City and London. His song 'Don't Fail Me' has featured on various adverts for shows such as Glee, Jersey Shore, Love & Hip Hop: Atlanta, and it also featured on Love Is Blind  season 1 episode 9 as part of their soundtrack. He also auditions for acting roles. As of 2021, he is a talent booker for the Peppermint Club in Los Angeles. He started a production company called a Mighty Lamb and later on he formed Breaking Sound a music company which helps artists trying to break into the music industry showcase their talents. Breaking Sound hosts a number of showcases in cities across the world including Los Angeles, New York City, Auckland, Sydney, Tel Aviv and many more. There is now also a Breaking Sound radio station, TV station and Breaking Sound record label. He married Melissa Caballero on 5 March 2015 in Florida. They currently live in Los Angeles. On 22 February 2020, his wife Melissa gave birth to their first child a daughter named Aya Goldspink at the Cedars-Sinai in Beverly Hills Los Angeles.On 25th April 2022 they welcomed their second daughter Nova Goldspink who was born at the Cedars-Sinai in Beverly Hills Los Angeles.
Stacey McClean (born 17 February 1989,  years old) is from Blackpool, Lancashire. She appeared on series 6 of The X Factor in 2009 and made it to the Top 6 Girls. McClean is married to former footballer Fraser Franks and has a daughter named Nellie (b.2019)
 (born 19 December 1987,  years old) was not originally selected to be a part of S Club Juniors but joined two days later. He was the oldest member of S Club 8 and starred in I Dream but did not appear in every episode due to studying for his GCSEs at the time of filming. After S Club 8 split in 2004, Renfree went back to college and trained at Laine Theatre Arts where he graduated with a National Diploma in Musical Theatre. He then went on to become a part of the original cast of 'Flashdance' the Musical which toured the UK in 2008/09 followed by his West End debut in 'We Will Rock You' 09/10 His dance career then furthered as he started dancing commercially working with the likes of Taylor Swift, Little Mix, Kylie Minogue, Sean Paul, Take That, Fleur East, Olly Murs, JLS, Alexandra Burke, Kimberly Wyatt & Adam Garcia. Plus TV shows such as X Factor, Britain's Got Talent, The Voice, The Brits and Royal Variety. Renfree is also very passionate about choreography and not long finished choreographing Eugenius! the musical in London. He has also worked with numerous music artists such as Matt Terry, The Saturdays, Nadine Coyle, Jack Hawitt and also on the X Factor Tours where he was also assistant show director. Renfree has choreographed the Professionals On Ice tours which lead him onto working with Torvil & Dean in Panto and then onto Dancing On Ice on ITV. Renfree was also on screen choreographer for The Greatest Dancer on BBC1 and worked with Maddie & Mackenzie Ziegler on the UK Tour.
 (born 30 November 1990,  years old) was not originally selected to be a part of S Club Juniors but she joined two days later when Simon Fuller said he didn't want to go ahead without Richings being a part of the group. Richings was the youngest member of S Club 8, and also a cast member on I Dream. She was never given a distinct solo during her time in the group, but had solo parts in two unperformed songs which were recorded as b-sides for the singles Sundown and Automatic High (Hannah performed on "Wherever Your Heart Beats" and "We Got You" respectively). She also had a solo in the song, "Here We Go", which was not released commercially but appeared on a free CD with a summer S Club Juniors magazine special. Alternatively, Richings would add high harmonies to the verses occasionally and choruses. Richings is married to Phil Blackford and they have four children two boys and two girls, Finley Jay (b. 2010) Poppy May (b. 2012), Oscar Joe (b. 2015), Pippa Flo (b. 2020)
Frankie Sandford (born 14 January 1989,  years old) was the second oldest member of S Club 8 and was the group's more prominent singer. She attended Hall Mead School, in Upminster, and already knew Rochelle Wiseman, a few years before they both got in S Club Juniors. In 2007 Sandford added two tracks to a MySpace music page, called Bored and Swallow. Later on that year she auditioned for and was accepted into The Saturdays, along with Wiseman, and they toured with Girls Aloud in May 2008 as the support act for the Tangled Up Tour. The group's first single, "If This Is Love", was released on 28 July 2008 and reached number eight in the UK. They also released "Up", "Issues", "Just Can't Get Enough" for Comic Relief and "Work". They have so far released 4 albums to critical and commercial success. On 9 October 2008, Sandford appeared as a guest on Never Mind the Buzzcocks on Phill Jupitus' team. In 2010, Sandford appeared as a featured artist in the Kids in Glass Houses' song "Undercover Lover" from their album, Dirt. Since December 2010 Sandford has been in a relationship with footballer Wayne Bridge. Sandford announced her engagement to Bridge on 8 April 2013 via Twitter. Their first child was born on 18 October 2013, a son, Parker. She gave birth to the couple's second child, another son, Carter, on 15 August 2015. She took part in, and finished runner-up in, the 2014 series of Strictly Come Dancing, partnered with professional dancer Kevin Clifton.
Rochelle Wiseman (born 21 March 1989,  years old) was a member of S Club 8 and a cast member on I Dream. She is half Jamaican. She attended Coopers Company and Coborn School in Upminster, and already knew Frankie Sandford, a few years before S Club Juniors. During her time in the group Wiseman had a stint as presenter on the BBC children's programme Smile. She is also part of pop-group the Saturdays along with Frankie Sandford. In February 2007, Wiseman appeared briefly on the BBC Two quiz show Never Mind The Buzzcocks as part of the show's regular Identity Parade feature, where contestants guess which person out of a lineup of five was featured in an old music video played only to the audience and viewers. The team, consisting of Bill Bailey, Russell Howard and Romeo Stodart (from the band The Magic Numbers), correctly picked Wiseman from the lineup. On 22 October 2009, Wiseman appeared as a guest on Never Mind the Buzzcocks on Phill Jupitus' team. Wiseman modelled for Love Me Love My Clothes (LMLC) and also took part in the Miss England contest, finishing in third place. In late October 2006 Wiseman was a member of a group called The TigerLilys, who had a MySpace page displaying two tracks. The group disbanded without being signed by a label or releasing any material commercially. Wiseman joined girl group The Saturdays, with whom she has achieved 13 UK top ten singles and 4 UK top 10 albums. Wiseman has been in a relationship with JLS member Marvin Humes since March 2010. They got engaged on 31 December 2011 and married on 27 July 2012 at Blenheim Palace. She is now professionally known by her married name, Rochelle Humes. On Twitter, on 22 November 2012, Rochelle announced she was expecting her first child, due in 2013. She gave birth to a daughter named Alaia-Mai Humes on the morning of 20 May 2013. Rochelle welcomed her third child, a son named Blake Hampton, born on 9 October 2020.

Discography

Together (2002)
Sundown (2003)

Filmography

Concert tours
Co-headlining
 S Club United (2003) 

Opening act
 S Club 7: Carnival Tour (2002)

References

External links

S Club 8 World

 
British child singers
British pop music groups
Child musical groups
Musical groups disestablished in 2005
Musical groups established in 2001
Musical groups from London
S Club 8 members